Qi Jingxuan (pinyin Qī Jīngxuān; born 9 November 1947) is a Chinese chess player, who holds the title International Master. He won the Chinese Chess Championship In 1975 and 1978.

In 1985, Qi competed in the Interzonal tournament in Taxco, Mexico. He scored 6½ points in a field of 16 players, finishing in 11th place.

Qi was a member of the Chinese national chess team. He was part of the national team at the Chess Olympiad three times in 1978-1980, 1984. He played a total of 38 games scoring 16 wins, 12 draws and 10 losses.

He also competed once at the World Team Chess Championship (1985) having played a total of 8 games (1 wins, 3 draws, 4 losses); and four times at the Asian Team Chess Championship (1977–1983) having played 31 games (18 wins, 7 draws, 6 losses).

Qi plays for the Guangdong chess club in the China Chess League (CCL).

See also
Chess in China

References

External links
Qi Jingxuan games at 365Chess.com

1947 births
Living people
Chess players from Zhejiang
Chess International Masters
Sportspeople from Ningbo